The Scarlet Letter: A Romance is a work of historical fiction by American author Nathaniel Hawthorne, published in 1850. Set in the Puritan Massachusetts Bay Colony during the years 1642 to 1649, the novel tells the story of Hester Prynne, who conceives a daughter with a man to whom she is not married and then struggles to create a new life of repentance and dignity. Containing a number of religious and historic allusions, the book explores themes of legalism, sin and guilt.

The Scarlet Letter was one of the first mass-produced books in the United States. It was popular when first published and is considered a classic work of American literature. The novel has inspired numerous film, television, and stage adaptations. Critics have described The Scarlet Letter as a masterwork, and novelist D. H. Lawrence called it a "perfect work of the American imagination".

Plot

In Puritan Boston, Massachusetts, a crowd gathers to witness the punishment of Hester Prynne, a young woman who has given birth to a baby of unknown paternity. Her sentence requires her to stand on the scaffold for three hours, exposed to public humiliation, and to wear a scarlet "A" for the rest of her life. As Hester approaches the scaffold, many of the women in the crowd are angered by her beauty and quiet dignity. When commanded and cajoled to name the father of her child, Hester refuses.

As Hester looks out over the crowd, she notices a small, misshapen man and recognizes him as her long-lost husband, who had been presumed lost at sea. When the husband sees Hester's shame, he asks a man in the crowd about her and is told the story of his wife's pregnancy. He angrily exclaims that the child's father should also be punished for his immoral act and vows to find the man. He chooses a new name, Roger Chillingworth, to aid him in his plan.

The Reverend John Wilson and the minister of Hester's church, Arthur Dimmesdale, question her, but she refuses to name her lover. After she returns to her prison cell, the jailer brings in Chillingworth, now a physician, to calm Hester and her child with his roots and herbs. He and Hester have an open conversation regarding their marriage and the fact that they were both in the wrong. Chillingworth demands to know who fathered Hester's child, but Hester refuses to divulge that information. He accepts Hester's refusal, stating that he will find out the man's identity anyway. Chillingworth threatens to destroy the father of Hester's child if Hester ever reveals the fact that Chillingworth is her husband. Hester agrees to Chillingworth's terms, although she suspects she will regret it.

Following her release from prison, Hester settles in a cottage at the edge of town and earns a meager living with her needlework, of extraordinary quality. She lives a quiet, sombre life with her daughter, Pearl, and performs acts of charity for the poor. She is troubled by her daughter's unusual fascination with the scarlet "A". The shunning of Hester also extends to Pearl, who has no playmates or friends except her mother. As she grows older, Pearl becomes capricious and unruly. Her conduct starts rumours, and the church members suggest Pearl be taken away from Hester. Hester, hearing rumours that she may lose Pearl, goes to speak to Governor Bellingham and ministers Wilson and Dimmesdale. Hester appeals to Dimmesdale in desperation, and the minister persuades the governor to let Pearl remain in Hester's care.

Because Dimmesdale's health has begun to fail, the townspeople are happy to have Chillingworth, the newly arrived physician, take up lodgings with their beloved minister. In close contact with Dimmesdale, Chillingworth begins to suspect that the minister's illness is the result of unconfessed guilt. He applies psychological pressure to the minister because he suspects Dimmesdale is Pearl's father. One evening, pulling the sleeping Dimmesdale's vestment aside, Chillingworth sees a symbol that represents his shame on the minister's pale chest.

Tormented by his guilty conscience, Dimmesdale goes to the square where Hester was punished years earlier. Climbing the scaffold in the dead of night, he admits his guilt but cannot find the courage to do so publicly in the light of day. Hester, shocked by Dimmesdale's deterioration, decides to obtain a release from her vow of silence to her husband.

Hester meets Dimmesdale in the forest and tells him of her husband and his desire for revenge. She convinces Dimmesdale to leave Boston in secret on a ship to Europe where they can start life anew. Inspired by this plan, the minister seems to gain energy.

On Election Day, Dimmesdale gives one of his most inspired sermons. As the procession leaves the church, however, Dimmesdale climbs upon the scaffold, confesses his sin, and dies in Hester's arms. Later, most witnesses swear that they saw a stigma in the form of a scarlet "A" upon his chest, although some deny this statement. Chillingworth loses his vengeance and dies as well, leaving Pearl a substantial inheritance.

After several years, Hester returns to her cottage and resumes wearing the scarlet letter. When she dies, she is buried near the grave of Dimmesdale, and they share a simple slate tombstone engraved with an escutcheon described as: "On a field, sable, the letter A, gules" (“On a black background, the letter A in red").

Major theme

Elmer Kennedy-Andrews remarks that Hawthorne in "The Custom-house" sets the context for his story and "tells us about 'romance', which is his preferred generic term to describe The Scarlet Letter, as his subtitle for the book – 'A Romance' – would indicate." In this introduction, Hawthorne describes a space between materialism and "dreaminess" that he calls "a neutral territory, somewhere between the real world and fairy-land, where the Actual and the Imaginary may meet, and each imbues itself with nature of the other". This combination of "dreaminess" and realism gave the author space to explore major themes.

Other themes
 
The experience of Prynne and Dimmesdale recalls the story of Adam and Eve because, in both cases, sin results in expulsion and suffering. But it also results in knowledge – specifically, in knowledge of what it means to be immoral. For Prynne, the Scarlet Letter is a physical manifestation of her sin and reminder of her painful solitude. She contemplates casting it off to obtain her freedom from an oppressive society and a checkered past as well as the absence of God. Because the society excludes her, she considers the possibility that many of the traditions upheld by the Puritan culture are untrue and are not designed to bring her happiness.

As for Dimmesdale, the "cheating minister", his sin gives him "sympathies so intimate with the sinful brotherhood of mankind" "that his chest vibrate[s] in unison with theirs." His eloquent and powerful sermons derive from this sense of empathy. The Dimmesdale narrative is quite in keeping with the oldest and most fully authorized principles in Christian thought. His "fall" is a descent from apparent grace to his own damnation; he appears to begin in purity but he ends in corruption. The subtlety is that the minister's belief is his own cheating, convincing himself at every stage of his spiritual pilgrimage that he is saved.

Throughout the work, the nature images contrast with the stark darkness of the Puritans and their systems. A rose bush's beauty forms a striking contrast to all that surrounds it. Later, the beautifully embroidered scarlet "A" is held out in part as an invitation to find "some sweet moral blossom" in the ensuing, tragic tale and in part as an image that "the deep heart of nature" (perhaps God) may look more kindly on the errant Prynne and her child than her Puritan neighbors do.

Chillingworth's misshapen body reflects (or symbolizes) the anger in his soul, just as Dimmesdale's illness reveals his inner turmoil. The outward man reflects the condition of the heart. This observation is thought to have been inspired by the deterioration of Edgar Allan Poe, whom Hawthorne "much admired".

Another theme is the extreme legalism of the Puritans and how Prynne chose not to conform to their rules and beliefs. Prynne was rejected by the villagers even though she spent her life doing what she could to help the sick and the poor. Because she was shunned, she spent her life mostly in solitude and did not attend church. Instead, she retreated into her own mind and her own thinking. Her thoughts began to stretch and go beyond what would be considered by the Puritans as safe. She still saw her sin, but she began to look on it differently than the villagers did. Prynne began to believe that a person's earthly sins do not necessarily condemn them. She even went so far as to tell Dimmesdale that their sin had been paid for by their daily penance and that their sin would not prevent them from reaching heaven.

Prynne was alienated from Puritan society, both in her physical life and spiritual life. When Dimmesdale died, she knew she had to move on because she could no longer conform to the Puritans' strictness. Her thinking was free from Puritan religious bounds and she had established her own moral standards and beliefs.

Publication history

It was long held that Hawthorne originally planned The Scarlet Letter to be a shorter novelette, part of a collection named Old Time Legends, and that his publisher, James T. Fields, convinced him to expand the work to a full-length novel. This is not true: Fields persuaded Hawthorne to publish The Scarlet Letter alone (along with the earlier-completed "Custom House" essay) but he had nothing to do with the length of the story. Hawthorne's wife Sophia later challenged Fields' claims a little inexactly: "he has made the absurd boast that he was the sole cause of the Scarlet Letter being published!" She noted that her husband's friend Edwin Percy Whipple, a critic, approached Fields to consider its publication. The manuscript was written at the Peter Edgerley House in Salem, Massachusetts, still standing as a private residence at 14 Mall Street. It was the last Salem home where the Hawthorne family lived.

The Scarlet Letter was first published in the spring of 1850 by Ticknor and Fields, beginning Hawthorne's most lucrative period. When he delivered the final pages to Fields in February 1850, Hawthorne said that "some portions of the book are powerfully written" but doubted it would be popular. In fact, the book was an instant best-seller, though, over fourteen years, it brought its author only $1,500. Its initial publication brought wide protest from natives of Salem, who did not approve of how Hawthorne had depicted them in his introduction "The Custom-House". A 2,500-copy second edition included a preface by Hawthorne dated March 30, 1850, that stated he had decided to reprint his Introduction "without the change of a word... The only remarkable features of the sketch are its frank and genuine good-humor ... As to enmity, or ill-feeling of any kind, personal or political, he utterly disclaims such motives".

The Scarlet Letter was also one of the first mass-produced books in America. In the mid-nineteenth century, bookbinders of home-grown literature typically hand-made their books and sold them in small quantities. The first mechanized printing of The Scarlet Letter, 2,500 volumes, sold out within ten days, and was widely read and discussed to an extent not much experienced in the young country up until that time.

A signed first edition, first printing of Scarlet Letter from March 1850 published by Ticknor, Reed and Fields sells for $22,500. Unsigned, the retail price is $12,500.

Critical response
On its publication, critic Evert Augustus Duyckinck, a friend of Hawthorne's, said he preferred the author's Washington Irving-like tales. Another friend, critic Edwin Percy Whipple, objected to the novel's "morbid intensity" with dense psychological details, writing that the book "is therefore apt to become, like Hawthorne, too painfully anatomical in his exhibition of them". English writer Mary Anne Evans writing as "George Eliot", called The Scarlet Letter, along with Henry Wadsworth Longfellow's 1855 book-length poem The Song of Hiawatha, the "two most indigenous and masterly productions in American literature". Most literary critics praised the book but religious leaders took issue with the novel's subject matter. Orestes Brownson alleged that Hawthorne did not understand Christianity, confession, and remorse. A review in The Church Review and Ecclesiastical Register concluded the author "perpetrates bad morals."

On the other hand, 20th-century writer D. H. Lawrence said that there could not be a more perfect work of the American imagination than The Scarlet Letter. Henry James once said of the novel, "It is beautiful, admirable, extraordinary; it has in the highest degree that merit which I have spoken of as the mark of Hawthorne's best things—an indefinable purity and lightness of conception...One can often return to it; it supports familiarity and has the inexhaustible charm and mystery of great works of art."

Allusions
The following are historical and Biblical references that appear in The Scarlet Letter.
 Anne Hutchinson, mentioned in Chapter 1, "The Prison Door", was a religious dissenter (1591–1643). In the 1630s she was excommunicated by the Puritans and exiled from Boston, and moved to Rhode Island.
 Ann Hibbins, who historically was executed for witchcraft in Boston in 1656, is depicted in The Scarlet Letter as a witch who tries to tempt Prynne to the practice of witchcraft.
 Richard Bellingham (c. 1592–1672), who historically was the governor of Massachusetts and deputy governor at the time of Hibbins's execution, was depicted in The Scarlet Letter as the brother of Ann Hibbins.
 Martin Luther (1483–1545) was a leader of the Protestant Reformation in Germany.
 Increase Mather (1639–1723), a powerful leader of the early Massachusetts Bay Colony. He was a Puritan minister involved with the government of the colony, and also the Salem Witch Trials.
 Sir Thomas Overbury and Dr. Forman were the subjects of an adultery scandal in 1615 in England. Dr. Forman was charged with trying to poison his adulterous wife and her lover. Overbury was a friend of the lover and was perhaps poisoned.
 John Winthrop (1588–1649), second governor of the Massachusetts Bay Colony.
 King's Chapel Burying Ground, mentioned in the final paragraph, exists; the Elizabeth Pain gravestone is traditionally considered an inspiration for the protagonists' grave.
 The story of King David and Bathsheba is depicted in the tapestry in Mr. Dimmesdale's room (chapter 9). (See II Samuel 11–12 for the Biblical story.)
 John Eliot (c. 1604–1690) was a Puritan missionary to the American Indians whom some called "the apostle to the Indians". He is referred to as "the Apostle Eliot" whom Dimmesdale has gone to visit at the beginning of Chapter 16, "A Forest Walk".

Symbols
The following are symbols that are embedded in The Scarlet Letter:
 The Scarlet Letter "A": In the beginning of the novel, Hester's letter "A" is a representation of her sin and adultery. However, as time progresses, the meaning of the letter changed. To some, it now meant "able". The novel states, "The letter was the symbol of her calling. Such helpfulness was found in her—so much power to do, and power to sympathize—that many people refused to interpret the scarlet A by its original signification. They said that it meant Able, so strong was Hester Prynne, with a woman's strength".
 Meteor: The meteor shaped as an A serves as another symbol in the book. To Reverend Dimmesdale, the meteor is a sign from God. God is revealing Dimmesdale's sin to everyone, and Dimmesdale is be ridden with guilt. However, others perceived the letter to be the symbol of an angel.
 Dimmesdale's name: Dimmesdale's name itself also holds symbolism. His name contains the root word "dim", which evokes faintness, weakness, and gloom and represents Dimmesdale's constant state since the commission of his sin.
 Pearl: Pearl is the embodiment of her parents' sin and passion. She is a constant reminder of the sin from which her mother cannot escape. It is mentioned she "was the scarlet letter in another form; the scarlet letter endowed in life".
 Rosebush: The rosebush is mentioned twice within the course of the story. It is first viewed as nature's way of offering beauty to those who leave and enter the prison, as well as providing a glimmer of hope to those who inhabit it. The rosebush is perceived as a symbol of brightness in a story filled with human sorrow.
 The Scaffold: The scaffold is mentioned three times throughout the novel. It can be viewed as separating the book into its beginning, middle, and end. It symbolizes shame, revelation of sin, and guilt, for it is the location where Hester received her scarlet letter as punishment and where Dimmesdale experienced his revelation through the meteor.

Adaptations and influence

The Scarlet Letter has inspired numerous film, television, and stage adaptations, and plot elements have influenced several novels, musical works, and screen productions.

Stage
The Scarlet Letter was appeared as a stage play as early as February 24, 1858, when an adaptation by George L. Aiken opened at Barnum's American Museum. George C. Howard and his wife starred as Dimmesdale and Hester.

Film
The story has been adapted to film multiple times, typically using the same title as the novel. The first film adaptation was a 1908 short film. This lost silent film was directed by Sidney Olcott from a screenplay by Gene Gauntier, who also starred as Hester. The oldest surviving film adaptation is a 1911 short film directed by Joseph W. Smiley and George Loane Tucker, with Lucille Young as Hester and King Baggot as Dimmesdale. The film has been subsequently adapted in Easy A, directed by Will Gluck from a screenplay by Bert V. Royal and starring Emma Stone as Olive Penderghast, the adaptation's version of Hester Prynne.

See also

Badge of shame
Boston in fiction
Colonial history of the United States
Illegitimacy in fiction
Whore of Babylon
Angel and Apostle, a 2005 novel about the same characters

References

Notes

Bibliography

 Boonyaprasop, Marina. Hawthorne’s Wilderness: Nature and Puritanism in Hawthorne's The Scarlet Letter and "Young Goodman Brown" (Anchor Academic Publishing, 2013).
 Brodhead, Richard H. Hawthorne, Melville, and the Novel. Chicago and London: The University of Chicago Press, 1973.
 Brown, Gillian. "'Hawthorne, Inheritance, and Women's Property", Studies in the Novel 23.1 (Spring 1991): 107–18.
 Cañadas, Ivan. "A New Source for the Title and Some Themes in The Scarlet Letter. Nathaniel Hawthorne Review 32.1 (Spring 2006): 43–51.
 Gartner, Matthew. "The Scarlet Letter and the Book of Esther: Scriptural Letter and Narrative Life". Studies in American Fiction 23.2 (Fall 1995): 131–51.
 
  
 Korobkin, Laura Haft. "The Scarlet Letter of the Law: Hawthorne and Criminal Justice". Novel: A Forum on Fiction 30.2 (Winter 1997): 193–217.
 
  
 Newberry, Frederick. "Tradition and Disinheritance in The Scarlet Letter. ESQ: A journal of the American Renaissance 23 (1977), 1–26; repr. in: The Scarlet Letter. W. W. Norton, 1988: pp. 231–48.
 Reid, Alfred S. Sir Thomas Overbury's Vision (1616) and Other English Sources of Nathaniel Hawthorne's 'The Scarlet Letter. Gainesville, FL: Scholar's Facsimiles and Reprints, 1957.
 Reid, Bethany. "Narrative of the Captivity and Redemption of Roger Prynne: Rereading The Scarlet Letter. Studies in the Novel 33.3 (Fall 2001): 247–67.
 Ryskamp, Charles. "The New England Sources of The Scarlet Letter. American Literature 31 (1959): 257–72; repr. in: The Scarlet Letter, 3rd ed. Norton, 1988: 191–204.
 Savoy, Eric. Filial Duty': Reading the Patriarchal Body in 'The Custom House. Studies in the Novel 25.4 (Winter 1993): 397–427.
 Sohn, Jeonghee. Rereading Hawthorne's Romance: The Problematics of Happy Endings. American Studies Monograph Series, 26. Seoul: American Studies Institute, Seoul National University, 2001; 2002.
 Stewart, Randall (ed.) The American Notebooks of Nathaniel Hawthorne: Based upon the Original Manuscripts in the Piermont Morgan Library. New Haven: Yale University Press, 1932.
 Waggoner, Hyatt H. Hawthorne: A Critical Study, 3rd ed. Cambridge, MA: Belknap Press of Harvard University Press, 1971.

External links

 
 
 
 "Critical Commentary Related to Female Characters in The Scarlet Letter—Hawthorne in Salem Website
 Excerpts from the opera The Scarlet Letter by Fredric Kroll at YouTube
 

 
1850 American novels
Adultery in novels
American historical novels
American novels adapted into films
American novels adapted into plays
Novels adapted into operas
American novels adapted into television shows
Novels by Nathaniel Hawthorne
Novels set in Boston
Novels set in the 1630s
Novels set in the 1640s
Novels set in the American colonial era